Herman Karl Haeberlin (11 September 1890, in Akron, Ohio – 12 February 1918) was a German-American anthropologist and linguist, who, before his death at 26, was considered to be one of the most brilliant students of Franz Boas. His work mainly focused on the Salish people and Salishan languages, in particular Lushootseed, Coeur d'Alène and Nuxalk.

References

Jay Miller: Regaining Dr. Hermann Haeberlin. Early Anthropology and Museology in Puget Sound, 1916–1917 (Lushootseed Press, 2007).

1890 births
1918 deaths
Linguists from the United States
American people of German descent
People from Akron, Ohio
20th-century American anthropologists
20th-century linguists